Polly Shannon (born September 1, 1973) is a Canadian actress. She is best known for her portrayal of Margaret Trudeau in the 2002 miniseries Trudeau, a film about the late Prime Minister of Canada Pierre Trudeau.

Biography
Polly Shannon was born September 1, 1973, in Kingston, Ontario, and raised in Aylmer, Quebec. Her father, Michael Shannon, is a doctor who served in various senior posts at Health Canada, including director general for the Laboratory Centre for Disease Control. Her mother, Mary Mackay-Smith, is a screenwriter for children's films and television. At the age of 13, after acting in theatre as a child, Shannon became a model, with assignments that took her to New York, London, and Tokyo. She attended Philemon Wright High School in Hull, Quebec.

In 1992, Shannon began her television career, landing a part in Catwalk, a YTV series about a struggling rock band. She went on to appear in several television series, including Sirens (1994) as Kelly Van Pelt, Ready or Not (1996) as Angelique, Side Effects (1996) as Lisa Burns, and the Canadian horror series The Hunger (1999) as Jen.

In 2002, Shannon appeared in the popular comedy film Men with Brooms in the role of Joanne. Her most notable role was playing Margaret Trudeau in the 2002 miniseries Trudeau, a film about the late Prime Minister of Canada Pierre Trudeau. "Playing Maggie was a really thrilling experience," Shannon noted at the time. "It was a challenge that was different from anything else I've done."

More recently, Shannon starred opposite Tom Selleck as his girlfriend Abby Taylor in two Jesse Stone television films, Stone Cold (2005) and Jesse Stone: Night Passage (2006).

Filmography

Films
 Love and Human Remains (1993), The Second Victim
 End of Summer (1995, TV movie), Maid
 No Contest (1995), Candice 'Candy' Wilson, Miss U.S.A.
 Fight for Justice: The Nancy Conn Story (1995, TV movie), Carol
 Snowboard Academy (1996), Tori
 Devil's Food (1996, TV movie)
 Frankenstein and Me (1996), Elizabeth
 The Girl Next Door (1999, TV movie), Fiona Winters
 My Date with the President's Daughter (1998, TV movie), Cashier (uncredited)
 Dirty Work (1998), Toni-Ann
 The Sheldon Kennedy Story (1999, TV movie), Jana
 Daydream Believers: The Monkees' Story (2000, TV movie), Phyllis Nesmith
 The Stalking of Laurie Show (2000, TV movie), Christine
 Harvard Man (2001), Juliet
 The Triangle (2001, TV movie), Julia Lee
 Men with Brooms (2002), Joanne
 Trudeau (2002, TV movie), Margaret Trudeau
 TrueSexLies (2003, short), Jackie
 Do or Die (2003, TV movie), Ruth Hennessey
 Hard to Forget (2003, TV movie), Sandra/Nicky Applewhite
 Ham & Cheese (2004), Lucy
 Direct Action (2004), Billie Ross
 Stone Cold (2005, TV movie), Abby Taylor
 Lie with Me (2005), Victoria
 Jesse Stone: Night Passage (2006, TV movie), Abby Taylor
 Miranda & Gordon (2006, short), Mother
 Victor (2008, TV movie), Donna Clavel
 Hide (2008), Jenny
 Hydra (2009, TV movie), Dr. Valerie Cammon
 One Love (2009, short), Olivia
 Concrete Canyons (2010, TV movie), Det. Susan Kinkaid
 Defining Moments (2021 film) as Marina

Television series
 Are You Afraid of the Dark? (1992, "The Tale of the Pinball Wizard"), Sophie
 Catwalk (1992–1994), Nina Moore
 The Hidden Room (1993, "Marion & Jean"), Counter Girl
 Sirens (1994, "The Needle and the Damage Done"), Kelly Van Pelt
 Forever Knight (1995, "Trophy Girl"), Liselle
 No Greater Love (1996, TV movie), Helen Horowitz
 Ready or Not (1996, "Glamour Girl"), Angelique
 Side Effects (1996, "Behind the Scenes"), Lisa Burns
 A Young Connecticut Yankee in King Arthur's Court (1995), Alisande/Alexandra
 Due South (1997, "Seeing Is Believing"), Judy Cates
 Eerie, Indiana: The Other Dimension (1998, "Perfect", 1998), Esthetician
 Highlander: The Raven (1998, "Passion Play"), Young Lucy Becker
 Earth: Final Conflict (1999, "Between Heaven and Hell"), Dr. Joyce Belman
 The Outer Limits (1999, "The Human Operators"), Human Operator of Starfighter-88
 Psi Factor: Chronicles of the Paranormal (1999, "Sacrifices"), Moira Stratton
 The Hunger (1999, "Brass"), Jen
 Code Name: Eternity (2000, "The Long Drop"), Cinda
 Twice in a Lifetime (1999–2000, 2 episodes), Vicky Sue
 La Femme Nikita (2001, 3 episodes), Michelle
 Doc (2001, "You Gotta Have Heart")
 Leap Years (2001, 5 episodes), Valerie
 Jeremiah (2002, "Ring of Truth"), Polly
 Street Time (2002, 5 episodes), Danielle
 Sue Thomas: F.B.Eye (2002–2004, 5 episodes), Darcy D'Angelo
 Wild Card (2003, "Backstabbed"), Ilana
 Puppets Who Kill (2004, "Portrait of Buttons"), Rosa
 The Jane Show (2004, "Pilot"), Susan
 Cold Case (2006, "The Red and the Blue"), Honey Sugar
 CSI: Miami (2006, "Double Jeopardy"), Allison Grady
 Shattered (2010, 2 episodes), Naomi
 Rookie Blue (2011, "Might Have Been"), Tori
 Less Than Kind (2012, "I'm Still Me"), Leslie

Awards and nominations

References

External links
 
 

1973 births
Living people
20th-century Canadian actresses
21st-century Canadian actresses
Actresses from Kingston, Ontario
Actresses from Quebec
Anglophone Quebec people
Canadian film actresses
Canadian people of Irish descent
Canadian television actresses
People from Gatineau